The Luvua River (or Lowa River) is a river in the Katanga Province of the Democratic Republic of the Congo (DRC). The Lualaba becomes the Congo River below the Boyoma Falls.

Course

The Luvua River leaves the north end of the lake at Pweto in the DRC. The middle course of the river is obstructed by a series of rapids, torrents and cataracts as it drops down from the plateau into the Congo Basin. At Piana Mwanga the falls are used to generate electricity for the Manono and Kitotolo mines. The Luvua has its peak discharge between March and May, with significantly lower discharge between September and November.

Watershed

The Congo River basin has the form of a huge, shallow saucer. The Luvua breaks through the southeast rim of this saucer, bringing water from the Mweru-Bangweulu watershed.
There is strong faunal evidence for the Luvua basin having once been part of the Zambezi system, with several species of fish that are common in the Zambezi system also being found in the Luvua.
Congo fauna have penetrated up the Luvua into Lake Mweru, but have been blocked by the Mambatuta Falls from entry into Lake Bangweulu. The transition occurred in the early Tertiary.

Congo headwater theory

Some geographers consider that the Luvua is a section of the Congo River. 
They place the origin of the Congo in the highlands between Tanzania and Zambia, where the Chambeshi River originates, flowing southwest to Lake Bangweulu. The Luvua river exits lake Mweru and flows northwest to join the Lualaba River, which becomes the Congo River further downstream.
Some say that the Congo begins where the Lualaba and Luvua meet.
The argument for treating the Lualaba as the main headwater, although it is much shorter, is that it has twice the volume of water at the point where it meets the Luvua.

History

The upper Luvua valley was home to the Bwile people.
Sometime after 1810 Kumwimbe Ngombe, ruler of the Luba Kingdom, conquered the region.
The European missionary and explorer David Livingstone "discovered" Lake Mweru in 1867, and formed the theory that the Luvua flowed to the Upper Nile. It was only after Livingstone's death that Henry Morton Stanley in his expedition of 1874-1877 showed that the river in fact was a tributary of the Congo.
Starting in 1891, a Swahili named Shimba launched a series of slave-raiding expeditions that depopulated most of the western shore of Lake Mweru. Shimba joined forces with another Swahili named Kafindo who was based on the upper Luvua and attacked the local Yeke ruler. These attacks continued until the Belgian Braseur arrived and began to "pacify" the region, which the European powers had agreed belonged to Belgium.

In 2000, during the Second Congo War, government forces suffered a major defeat by Rwandan forces at Pweto, at the source of the river. The DRC forces had brought most of their armored vehicles across the river. There was a single ferry, and they did not have enough time to evacuate the vehicles before the Rwandans arrived. Soldiers loaded a T-62 tank awkwardly, and the ferry tipped over and sank. The Rwandans found 33 tanks, as well as other vehicles, which the DRC troops had tried to burn.

References

Sources

External links
 A Trans-Africa Inland Waterway System?
 Democratic Republic of Congo Waterways Assessment 

Rivers of the Democratic Republic of the Congo
Lake Mweru
Lualaba River
Miombo
Haut-Katanga Province
Tanganyika Province